The following is a list of Odonata species recorded in Ireland. Common names are those given in the standard literature; where a different name has been given in The Natural History of Ireland's Dragonflies, this is given in brackets. Most of these species are resident, others are vagrants and some have not been recorded since the nineteenth century.

Suborder Zygoptera (damselflies)

Family Calopterygidae (demoiselles)
Banded demoiselle (banded jewelwing)  Calopteryx splendens
Beautiful demoiselle  Calopteryx virgo

Family Lestidae (emerald damselflies)
Scarce emerald damselfly (turlough spreadwing)  Lestes dryas 
Emerald damselfly (common spreadwing)  Lestes sponsa

Family Coenagrionidae (blue, blue-tailed, and red damselflies)

Irish damselfly (Irish bluet)  Coenagrion lunulatum. The common name comes from the fact that it is found in Ireland but not in Britain.
Azure damselfly (azure bluet)  Coenagrion puella
Variable damselfly (variable bluet)  Coenagrion pulchellum 
Common blue damselfly (common bluet)  Enallagma cyathigerum 
Blue-tailed damselfly (common bluetip)  Ischnura elegans 
Scarce blue-tailed damselfly (small bluetip)  Ischnura pumilio 
Large red damselfly (spring redtail)  Pyrrhosoma nymphula

Suborder Anisoptera (dragonflies)

Family Gomphidae (club-tailed dragonflies)
Common clubtail (club-tailed dragonfly)  Gomphus vulgatissimus. No modern records.

Family Aeshnidae (hawkers and emperors)

Southern hawker  Aeshna cyanea. Vagrant.
Brown hawker (amber-winged hawker)  Aeshna grandis 
Common hawker (moorland hawker)  Aeshna juncea 
Migrant hawker (autumn hawker)  Aeshna mixta. Recent colonist.
Emperor (blue emperor)  Anax imperator. Recent colonist.
Lesser emperor (yellow-ringed emperor)  Anax parthenope.  Vagrant.
Hairy dragonfly (spring hawker)  Aeshna grandis 
Vagrant emperor  Hemianax ephippiger. Vagrant.

Family Corduliidae (emerald dragonflies)
Downy emerald  Cordulia aenea 
Northern emerald (moorland emerald)  Somatochlora arctica

Family Libellulidae (chasers, skimmers, and darters)

Broad-bodied chaser  Libellula depressa. No modern records.
Scarce chaser  Libellula fulva. No modern records.
Four-spotted chaser  Libellula quadrimaculata 
Black-tailed skimmer  Orthetrum cancellatum 
Keeled skimmer (heathland skimmer)  Orthetrum coerulescens 
Black darter  Sympetrum danae 
Yellow-winged darter  Sympetrum flaveolum. Vagrant.
Red-veined darter  Sympetrum fonscolombii. Status unknown.
Ruddy darter  Sympetrum sanguineum 
Common darter  Sympetrum striolatum

Discounted records 
The following species have been included in previous lists of Irish dragonflies, but are no longer regarded as having been reliably recorded:
 Willow emerald damselfly
 Small red damselfly
 Red-eyed damselfly
 Golden-ringed dragonfly

See also 
 List of Odonata species of Great Britain
Lt-Col. F. C. Fraser, 1956  Handbooks For The Identification of British Insects: Vol 1 Part 10. Odonata. Royal Entomological Society. online as pdf

References

External links 
 Dragonfly Ireland

Ireland
Dragonflies of Europe
Odonata of Ireland
Ireland, odonata
Odonata